Andrey Vassilyevich Prokofyev (6 June 1959, Sverdlovsk, USSR – 19 June 1989, Sverdlovsk, USSR) was a Soviet athlete, winner of a gold medal in the 4 × 100 m relay at the 1980 Summer Olympics. He committed suicide by hanging in 1989.

Biography
At the Moscow Olympics, Prokofyev was fourth in the 110 m hurdles and won the gold medal running the anchoring leg of the Soviet 4 × 100 m relay team. At the 1982 European Championships, Prokofyev won the silver medal in the 110 m hurdles and again a gold in the 4 × 100 m relay. At the first World Championships, Prokofyev was eliminated in the heats of the 110 m hurdles, but won a bronze medal as a member of the Soviet 4 × 100 m relay team.

Achievements

References

External links

World Championships
Universiade

1959 births
Soviet male hurdlers
Soviet male sprinters
Olympic athletes of the Soviet Union
Athletes (track and field) at the 1980 Summer Olympics
Olympic gold medalists for the Soviet Union
1989 suicides
World Athletics Championships athletes for the Soviet Union
World Athletics Championships medalists
European Athletics Championships medalists
Olympic gold medalists in athletics (track and field)
Universiade medalists in athletics (track and field)
Goodwill Games medalists in athletics
Universiade gold medalists for the Soviet Union
Medalists at the 1980 Summer Olympics
Medalists at the 1979 Summer Universiade
Medalists at the 1983 Summer Universiade
Competitors at the 1986 Goodwill Games
Suicides by hanging in the Soviet Union
1989 deaths
Ural State Law University alumni